St Mary's Church is a parish church in the Church of England in Radcliffe on Trent, Nottinghamshire.

The church is Grade II listed by the Department for Digital, Culture, Media and Sport as it is a building of special architectural or historic interest.

History
There was a medieval church but little remains. The chancel was built in 1858 by Charles Bailey of Newark-on-Trent. The rest was built by Joseph Goddard and Alfred Henry Paget of Leicester between 1879 and 1880.

It is now part of the united parish with St. Peter and St. Paul's Church, Shelford.

Bells
There are eight bells by Taylors of Loughborough dating from 1947. The heaviest is 15 cwt.

Parsonage
The parsonage house dates from 1827 and was designed by Henry Moses Wood.

References

Nikolaus Pevsner The Buildings of England, Nottinghamshire'

Grade II listed churches in Nottinghamshire
Church of England church buildings in Nottinghamshire
Mary